Bruno Ferreira Morgado (born 16 December 1997) is a Swiss professional footballer who plays as a leftback for Bellinzona.

Club career
On 11 September 2016, Morgado made his professional debut with FC Sion in a 2016–17 Swiss Super League match against FC Thun.

International career
Morgado was born in Switzerland and is of Portuguese descent. He is a former youth international for Switzerland.

References

External links

 FC Sion official website  
 SFL Profile
 SFV U18 Profile
 SFV U19 Profile
 SFV U20 Profile

1997 births
People from Monthey
Sportspeople from Valais
Living people
Swiss men's footballers
Switzerland youth international footballers
Swiss people of Portuguese descent
Association football fullbacks
FC Sion players
FC Rapperswil-Jona players
Neuchâtel Xamax FCS players
AC Bellinzona players
Swiss Super League players
Swiss Challenge League players